Guys from Mars is a 2011 Russian romantic comedy film directed by Sergey Osipyan.

The film was released in Russia on Мay 5, 2011. The film was part of the main festival program of the MIFF.

Plot
In the center of the film is the manager Petya Starikov, who works at a giant chocolate factory "Marz". When a car is stolen from him, he simultaneously turns for help in the search to bandits, to the traffic police, and to the district police station. Everyone fleeces money from Pyotr for searching for the car, but in fact, no one does anything. And at work, Pyotr gets a promotion: the foreign owner of the factory suddenly makes him the head of an advertising project. Until the end of the month, Pyotr should create a new concept for advertising chocolate bars. Pyotr accidentally finds his car himself, but in a completely broken state. The police accused Pyotr of stealing his car and in order to remove this accusation from him, Pyotr agrees to give away the bandits whom he asked for help in finding the car. The fuss around the car does not let Pyotr seriously concentrate on his work and by the end, exhausted by the problems, he tells the owner of the company that the dream of an ideal commercial is unrealizable.

Cast
Sergey Abroskin —  Petya Starikov
Kseniya Kutepova —  Liza Pryalkina
Angelina Mirimskaya —  Yulia
Artyom Tkachenko — Kolya
Igor Chernevich — Kuzyk
Igor Yatsko — Boombox
Egor Barinov — Khrustalev
Vladas Bagdonas — Phil Donahue
Anna Arlanova  — Rita
Yevgenia Dobrovolskaya — Yulia's mother
Oleg Danilevsky — militia assassin
Irina Medvedeva — Masha Zaitseva
Amadu Mamadakov — painter
Nikita Emshanov	— Gena Zver

References

External links
 
 Официальный сайт фильма «Парень с Марса» 

Russian romantic comedy films
2011 romantic comedy films
2011 films
2011 directorial debut films